Mike Morasky (born July 14, 1964) is an American composer, visual effects artist, director, and programmer. He is best known for his work at Valve composing the scores for Team Fortress 2, the Left 4 Dead series, Portal 2, Counter-Strike: Global Offensive and Half-Life: Alyx. He is also known for his visual effects work on The Lord of the Rings and The Matrix trilogies as well as founding the underground art bands Steel Pole Bath Tub, Milk Cult and DUH.

Biography
For Valve, Morasky composed the music for Team Fortress 2, Portal (with Kelly Bailey), Left 4 Dead, Left 4 Dead 2 (including composing and playing the guitar, keyboard and bass for the fictional hard rock band "Midnight Riders"), Portal 2, Counter-Strike: Global Offensive, and Half-Life: Alyx.

He also worked as a senior visual effects artist and technical director on The Lord of the Rings and The Matrix film trilogies.

Morasky was part of the now-defunct hardcore punk/noise rock band Steel Pole Bath Tub, which he founded in 1986 with Dale Flattum. S.P.B.T. disbanded in 2002.

On Valve's official website, his function was described as follows: "Morasky's life and career sounds a lot like one of the post-modern audio collages he is so fond of creating. Teenage guitar player in a bar band in Montana; award-winning experimental composer in Tokyo; audio hardware programmer in Silicon Valley; underground art rocker touring the world; 3D animator and director for television; electronic audio collage artist in France and Japan; visual fx artist on The Lord of the Rings and Matrix trilogies; AI animation instructor at an art college. These days, Mike is doing some combination of all these things at Valve."

Filmography

Visual Effects
The Lord of the Rings: The Fellowship of the Ring (2001) (lead massive crowd technical director)
The Lord of the Rings: The Two Towers (2002) (senior massive technical director)
The Matrix Reloaded (2003) (lead technical director)
The Matrix Revolutions (2003) (sentinel/swarm lead)
The Lord of the Rings: The Return of the King (2003) (senior massive technical director)
Catwoman (2004) (CG supervisor)
Drawing Restraint 9 (2005) (lead technical director)
Pirates of the Caribbean: Dead Man's Chest (2006) (digital artist)

Awards
 "Outstanding Achievement in Original Music Composition" - "Portal 2" - Academy of Interactive Arts and Sciences - (2012)
 "Best Audio" - "Portal 2" - Game Developers Choice Award - (2012)
 "Best Interactive Score" - "Portal 2" - Game Audio Network Guild - (2012)
 "Best Dialog" - "Portal 2" - Game Audio Network Guild - (2012)
 "Best Original Vocal Song - Pop" - "Portal 2" - Game Audio Network Guild - (2012)
 "Best Game Music of 2011" - "Portal 2" - Kotaku - (2012)
 "Best Soundtrack (Nomination)" - "Portal 2" - X-Play - (2011) 
 "Best Sound Design (Nomination)" - "Portal 2" - X-Play - (2011) 
 "Outstanding Creative Achievement / Interactive Entertainment Sound Production (Nomination)" - "Portal 2" - TEC Awards - (2012)
 "Best Original Score (Nomination)" - "Portal 2" - Spike TV Video Game Awards - (2012)
 "Audio of the Year (Nomination)" - "Portal 2" - Game Audio Network Guild - (2012)
 "Sound Design of the Year (Nomination)" - "Portal 2" - Game Audio Network Guild - (2012)
 "Best Cinematic / Cut Scene Sound (Nomination)" - "Left 4 Dead 2" - Game Audio Network Guild - (2010)
 "Best Use of Multi-Channel Surround in a Game (Nomination)" - "Left 4 Dead 2" - Game Audio Network Guild - (2010)
 "Best Use of Sound" - "Left 4 Dead" - What If Gaming - (2008)

Presentations and papers

"Left 4 Dead" - Game Audio Network Guild Summer Summit (2010)
"Matrix Revolutions: Techniques and Methodologies With Large Scale Sentinel 'Swarm' Scenes" - Silicon Valley ACM Siggraph (2004)
"Matrix Sequels: Animation and Pipeline Methodologies in Large CG Film Productions" - San Francisco ACM Siggraph Student Chapter (2004)
"Wiring Cracker: The Mechanics of a Non-Anthropomorphic, Real-Time, Performance Animation Puppet" - ACM Siggraph (1998)

Discography

Film
 Dopamine (2003) (guitar)
 One Winter Story (2006)
 I Die Daily: The Making of Matthew Barney's 'Cremaster Cycle''' (2007)
 Life in Flight (2008)
 Ayiti Mon Amour (2016)

Video games

Steel Pole Bath Tub

AlbumsButterfly Love (Boner Records, 1989)Lurch (Boner Records, 1990)Tulip (Boner Records, 1990)The Miracle of Sound in Motion (Boner Records, 1993)Your Choice Live Series 019 (Your Choice Records, 1993)Best of Steel Pole Bathtub (Sento, 1993)Scars from Falling Down (Slash/London, 1995)Unlistenable (Zero to One, 2002)

Eps and Singles
"I Dreamed I Dream"  - Split 7'/10" With Melvins - (Boner/Tupelo, 1989)
"Arizona Garbage Truck / Voodoo Chile" (Sympathy for the Recording Industry, 1990)
"European Son / Venus in Furs" (The Communion Label, 1991)
"We Walk" - Split 7" with Jawbreaker - (Staple Gun Records, 1991)
"Your Choice Live" - Limited 7" - (Your Choice Records, 1991)
"Bozeman" (Boner/Tupelo, 1992)
"Some Cocktail Suggestions EP" (Boner/Tupelo, 1994)
"Tragedy Ecstasy Doom and So On EP" (Genius Records, 1995)
"Auf Wiedersehen / Surrender" (Man's Ruin Records, 1995)
"Twist / Surrender" (Slash Records, 1995)
"Hey Bo Diddley Live in Tokyo" - Split 7" with Unwound - (Honey Bear Records, 1996)
"Soul Cannon"  - "Live at Emo's: Volume 2 - #2: This Place Sucks" - Split 7" with "Unsane" / "Gomez" - (No Lie Records, 1997)

Compilations
"Bee Sting" - The Thing That Ate Floyd - (Lookout! Records, 1988)
"We Walk" - Surprise Your Pig - A Tribute to R.E.M. - (Staple Gun Records, 1992)
"Chemical Warfare" - Virus 100 - (Alternative Tentacles, 1992)
"Down All the Days" - The Mission District: 17 Reasons - 7" Box (Mission Merchants, 1992)
"Kung Fu Love" - Milk for Pussy - (Mad Queen Records, 1993)
"Froggie Would a Wooing Go" - Power Flush - as "Mud Bath" with Mudwimmin - (Broken Rekids, 1993)
"The Seventh Hour of the Seventh Day" - Smitten - A Love Song Compilation - (Karate Brand Records, 1994)
"A Washed Out Monkey Star Halo" - Dope-Guns-'N-Fucking In The Streets Volume Ten - (Amphetamine Reptile Records, 1994)
"The 500 Club" - CMJ New Music August - Volume 24 - (College Music Journal, 1995)
"Twist" - Introducing Vol. 2 - (Indigo, 1995)
"Twist" - London Records (London Records, 1995)
"The Charm" - Jabberjaw... Pure Sweet Hell - (Mammoth, 1996)
"The Ghost" - Twisted Willie - (Justice Records, 1996)
"A Washed Out Monkey Star Halo" - Dope-Guns-'N-Fucking In The Streets Volumes 8-11 - (Amphetamine Reptile Records, 1997)
"Soul Cannon" - Live at Emo's BOX SET - 7" Box (No Lie Music, 1997)
"I Dreamed I Dream" - Confuse Yr Idols (A Tribute To Sonic Youth) (Narnack Records, 2004)

Milk Cult

Albums
"Love God" (Boner Records / Tupelo Recording, 1993)
"Burn or Bury" (Priority Records, 1994)
"Bruce Lee Marvin Gaye" (ZK Records, 1994)
"Project M-13" (Zero to One Records, 2000)

Eps and Singles
"Mama Paranoia"  - Split 7' With Dosed Bernie - (Box Dog, 1994)

Tumor Circus

AlbumsTumor Circus (Alternative Tentacles, 1991)

Eps and Singles
"Take Me Back or I'll Drown Our Dog"  - 7'/12" - (Alternative Tentacles, 1991)
"Meathook Up My Rectum"  - 7' - (Alternative Tentacles, 1991)

Compilations
"Meathook Up My Rectum" - "The Bat is Back" - (Alternative Tentacles, 1992)

AlbumsBlowhard (Boner Records, 1991)The Unholy Handjob (Alternative Tentacles, 1995)

Producer/Engineer
Jawbreaker - "Chesterfield King" EP (Communion/Tupelo, 1991)
Jawbreaker - Bivouac (Communion/Tupelo, 1991)
Warlock Pinchers - Circusized Peanuts (Boner Records, 1991)
Blister - Glitches (1992) (Executive Producer)
Tumor Circus - Tumor Circus (Alternative Tentacles, 1991)
Jello Biafra - I Blow Minds for a Living'' (Alternative Tentacles, 1991)

References

21st-century American composers
Video game composers
Valve Corporation people
DUH (band) members
Place of birth missing (living people)
1964 births
Living people